Page is an extinct town in King County, in the U.S. state of Washington. The GNIS classifies it as a populated place.

It was located on the North Fork Green River, ten miles east of Palmer (by road).

The community took its name from the Page Lumber Company.

References

Ghost towns in Washington (state)
Geography of King County, Washington